Issa Kallon (born 3 January 1996) is a professional footballer who currently plays for Chinese Super League club Shanghai Port as a winger. Born in the Netherlands, he represents the Sierra Leone national team.

Club career

Kallon is a youth exponent from FC Utrecht. He made his Eredivisie debut at 24 August 2014 in a 1–2 away win against Feyenoord.

On 27 July 2016 he went on a 1-year loan to FC Emmen.

On 14 August 2017, Kallon joined SC Cambuur. He left the club after five years, on 30 June 2022, as his contract expired.

On 28 July 2022, Kallon joined Chinese Super League club Shanghai Port.

International career
Born in the Netherlands, Kallon is of Sierra Leonean descent. He is a former youth international for the Netherlands. Kallon was included in the Sierra Leone squad for the 2022 Africa Cup of Nations. He debuted with Sierra Leone in a 2–2 tie with the Ivory Coast on 16 January 2022.

Career Statistics

References

External links
 Career stats - Voetbal International
 

1996 births
Living people
People from Zeist
Sierra Leonean footballers
Dutch footballers
Netherlands youth international footballers
Dutch people of Sierra Leonean descent
Dutch sportspeople of African descent
Eredivisie players
Eerste Divisie players
Chinese Super League players
FC Utrecht players
FC Emmen players
SC Cambuur players
Shanghai Port F.C. players
Sierra Leonean expatriate footballers
Sierra Leonean expatriate sportspeople in China
Expatriate footballers in China
Association football forwards
Footballers from Utrecht (province)
2021 Africa Cup of Nations players
Dutch expatriate sportspeople in China
Dutch expatriate footballers